The 1997 Major League Soccer Supplemental Draft was held in Fort Lauderdale, Florida on February 2, 1997.

Round 1

Round 1 trades

Round 2

Round 2 trades

Round 3

Round 3 trades

References

Major League Soccer drafts
Supplemental Draft
MLS Supplemental Draft
Soccer in Florida
Sports in Fort Lauderdale, Florida
Events in Fort Lauderdale, Florida
MLS Supplemental Draft